Miss Universe Canada 2019 was the 17th Miss Universe Canada pageant, held on August 17, 2019, at the John Bassett Theatre in the Metro Toronto Convention Centre in Toronto, Ontario. Marta Stepien of South Ontario crowned Alyssa Boston of Tecumseh at the end of the event. Alyssa represented Canada at Miss Universe 2019, while the first runner-up represented Canada at Miss International 2019, the second runner-up represented Canada in Reinado Internacional del Café 2019, and Aiona Santana represented Canada in Egypt as the First Miss Eco Teen Canada | Miss Eco Teen Canada 2019.

Final results

Special Awards

Contestants
The 55 national delegates competing for the title of Miss Universe Canada 2019:

References

External links
Official Website

2019
2019 in Toronto
2019 beauty pageants